What's up or variants may refer to:

Film and television
What'z Up?, 1994 American teens TV show
What's Up (TV series), 2011-12 South Korean musical drama
What's Up! Que Pasa, American children's educational TV show
 WatsUp TV, pan-African series of TV shows
 Whassup?, advertising campaign for Budweiser-brand beer

Music
 What's Up? (musical), Lerner and Loewe musical

Albums
 What's Up (Bill Hardman album), 1989
 What's Up? (Michel Camilo album), 2013
 What's Up?, an album by Klaus "Major" Heuser Band, 2016

Songs
 What's Up? (4 Non Blondes song), 1992
 "What's Up" (Myname song), 2012
 "What Up", by Pimp C, 2010

Groups
 Wassup (group), South Korean girl group
 What's Up!, Swedish boy band

Other uses 
What's Up weekly, newspaper in El Paso, Texas

See also
 Wazzup Wazzup, Philippine comedic-news TV series
 WhatsApp, instant messaging application for smartphones